The 2008 ABC Supply Company A.J. Foyt 225 was the sixth round of the 2008 IndyCar Series season and took place on June 1, 2008 at the  Milwaukee Mile, in West Allis, Wisconsin. Marco Andretti took the lead from the pole position, and led the first 40 laps. He was chased early by Scott Dixon and teammate Tony Kanaan. Graham Rahal, who started on the outside of the front row, shuffled back, but remained in the top 5 for the first half of the race. The first half was mostly green, with only a minor caution involving Oriol Servià and another for debris. Later in the first fuel segment, Andretti's handling started to suffer, and Dixon took over the lead. Hélio Castroneves took over second, and Andretti fell back as deep as tenth.

On lap 130, Rahal went high in turn three to pass Darren Manning. He got into the marbles, and brushed along the wall in turn four. After holding the lead for 136 laps, Dixon was finally challenged by Ryan Briscoe. Briscoe took over the lead on lap 177, and held it until a green flag pit stop on lap 194. After a sequence of pit stops, Castroneves, Andretti and Dan Wheldon all cycled near the front. When all pit stops were complete, Briscoe held a half-second lead over Dixon. The two battled for the lead over the final 21 laps.

With less than three laps to go, Andretti dove underneath Ed Carpenter in turn one. The cars touched, and both cars spun into the wall. Vítor Meira became caught up in the smoke, and rode up over Andretti, becoming airborne. He landed upright, and all drivers were uninjured. The race finished under caution with Briscoe picking up his first career IndyCar victory, and 300th overall win for the Mooresville, North Carolina-based Penske Racing in all motorsports series.

Result

References 
IndyCar Series (Archived 2009-05-21)
Weather report

ABC Supply Company A.J. Foyt 225
ABC Supply
ABC Supply Company A.J. Foyt 225
Milwaukee Indy 225